The 2017 NCAA Division III football season was the portion of the 2017 college football season organized by the NCAA at the Division III level in the United States. Under Division III rules, teams were eligible to begin play on August 31, 2017. The season ended with the NCAA Division III Football Championship, also known as the Stagg Bowl, on December 15, 2017, at Salem Football Stadium in Salem, Virginia. Mount Union earned their 13th national title, defeating defending national champions Mary Hardin–Baylor.

Conference and program changes
The 2017 season saw several significant changes to the landscape of Division III football:
 The New England Football Conference, a football-only league that had operated since 1965, became the football league of the all-sports Commonwealth Coast Conference (CCC), operating as Commonwealth Coast Football (CCC Football). The football league remains a separate entity from the overall conference.
 The New England Women's and Men's Athletic Conference began sponsoring football.
 The Southern Collegiate Athletic Conference, which had sponsored football since its creation in 1962 as the College Athletic Conference, ended sponsorship of football at the end of the 2016 season. The league had lost most of its membership when seven schools left in 2012 to form the Southern Athletic Association.
 The New England Small College Athletic Conference eliminated its members' annual pre-season scrimmages in favor of a 9th regular season game and ensuring all conference members play one another each season. Conference members remain ineligible for postseason tournament play.
 The Empire 8 and Liberty League announced on July 5 the creation of the New York State Bowl Game, which will feature the top two teams from each conference who failed to make the DIII tournament. It will be held immediately for the 2017 season, on November 18.
 Maranatha Baptist University announced that it would be dropping it's football program on February 17. The school cited the resignation of coach Nate Spate, small roster numbers, and the struggle of filling a schedule as an independent all as factors in the decision.

A full list of Division III teams can be viewed on the D3football website.

Conference standings

Preseason

Overseas exhibition games
Because Division III football teams do not award scholarships, they are permitted by NCAA rules to occasionally travel outside the United States to tour and play exhibition matches. Several teams took off-season trips in late spring 2017 and played primarily non-college club teams, with the exception of Illinois Wesleyan, who played a Japanese college team. All of the games were won by the Division III schools, which are displayed in bold.

Postseason
Twenty-five conferences met the requirements for an automatic ("Pool A") bid to the playoffs. Besides the NESCAC, which does not participate in the playoffs, two conferences had no Pool A bid. The American Southwest, which had fallen below the required seven members in 2013 and lost its Pool A bid after the two-year grace period, was in the second year of the two-year waiting period, having attained seven members in 2016; the NEWMAC, having just begun football sponsorship, was in the first year of the waiting period. Despite losing three members, the Liberty League retained its Pool A bid, but entered the grace period.

Schools not in Pool A conferences were eligible for Pool B. The number of Pool B bids was determined by calculating the ratio of Pool A conferences to schools in those conferences and applying that ratio to the number of Pool B schools. The 25 Pool A conferences contained 215 schools, an average of 8.6 teams per conference. Eighteen schools were in Pool B, enough for two bids.

The remaining five playoff spots were at-large ("Pool C") teams.

Playoff bracket

* Home team    † Overtime    Winner

Bowl games

See also
2017 NCAA Division I FBS football season
2017 NCAA Division I FCS football season
2017 NCAA Division II football season
2017 NAIA football season

References